Highway 101 is the debut album by the American country music band of the same name. It saw the group shoot straight to the top of the country music charts with two singles hitting the #1 spot on the Billboard Country charts, another rising to #2, and a fourth song at #4. The album itself was a #7 Country album. The #1 hits were "Somewhere Tonight" and "Cry, Cry, Cry." Also, "Whiskey, If You Were a Woman" rose to #2, and "The Bed You Made for Me" did almost as well, reaching #4.  Track 4, "Woman Walk the Line" was redone by country singer Trisha Yearwood for her sophomore effort, released in 1992.

Track listing

Charts

Weekly charts

Year-end charts

Singles

Personnel

Highway 101
Paulette Carlson – lead vocals, acoustic guitar
Cactus Moser – drums, background vocals
Curtis Stone – bass guitar, background vocals
Jack Daniels – electric guitar, background vocals

Additional musicians
Larry Byrom – acoustic guitar, electric guitar
Dennis Burnside – piano
John Hobbs – piano
Jay Dee Maness – steel guitar
Tommy Spurlock – steel guitar
Harry Stinson – background vocals
Dennis Wilson – background vocals
Paul Worley – electric guitar
Curtis Young – background vocals

References

1987 debut albums
Highway 101 albums
Warner Records albums
Albums produced by Paul Worley